The Diamond Dogs was a Swedish rock band founded in Katrineholm during the early 1990s, by vocalist Sören 'Sulo' Karlsson and guitarist Anders 'Boba' Lindström.

History
The line-up has changed several times throughout the band's career and has included members from bands such as The Hellacopters, Stefan Sundströms back-up band, Wilmer X, Snatch, Dogs D'Amour, Nymphet Noodlers, Hederos & Hellberg and The Soundtrack Of Our Lives however the band's music has always been rooted in 1970's rock. The band has also toured extensively with bands such as Hanoi Rocks, The Damned, Nazareth, Georgia Satellites, Ian Hunter and The Cult. The band has been especially successful in Italy with crowds of up to ten thousand attending some of their concerts. In 2002, the band teamed up with the Swedish musician,  Lennart Eriksson, to record a track for a tribute album to Nationalteatern along with The Latin Kings frontman Dogge Doggelito. The band recorded all of their live shows throughout Spain. The band announced their split after 25 years, on their Facebook page on September 29, 2015.

Line up

Former members
Sören 'Sulo' Karlsson - Vocals
Lars Karlsson – Guitar
Henrik 'The Duke of Honk' Widén – Keyboard
Martin Tronsson – Bass
Johannes Nordell – Drums
Magic - Saxophone
Anders Lindström - Guitar
Stevie Klasson - Guitar
Jesper Karlsson - Drums
Magnus Leje - Guitar
Stefan 'Björken' Björk - Bass
Robert Dahlqvist – Guitar
Kent Axén - Guitar
Fredrik Fagerlund - Guitar
Johan Johansson - Bass
Daniel Johansson - Drums

Selected discography

Albums
1994: Honked 
2001: As Your Greens Turn Brown
2002: Too Much is Always Better than Not Enough
2003: That's the Juice I'm On - alternative mixes and unreleased tracks from earlier album sessions
2004: Black River Road 
2005: Bound to Ravage - Greatest Hits compilation
2006: Up the Rock 
2008: Most Likely 
2010: The Grit & The Very Soul
2012: Set Fire to It All
2015: Quitters & Complainers
2019: Recall Rock 'N' Roll And The Magic Soul
2022: Slap Bang Blue Rendezvous

EPs
2000: Among the Nonbelievers 
2001: Shortplayer
2008: The Conception

Singles
1993: "Blue Eyes Shouldn't be Cryin'" 
1995: "Good Time Girl"
1996: "Need of Ammunition"

Other releases
2002: contributed to tribute album Nationalsånger - Hymner från Vågen och EPAs torg
2004: Atlantic Crossover - Diamond Dogs vs Jeff Dahl
2008: Cookin - performing the music of Sam Cooke

References

External links
Official MySpace

Swedish rock music groups
Locomotive Music artists